Robert Culbertson Hope (12 May 1812 – 24 June 1878) was a medical practitioner and member of the Victorian Legislative Council.

Life and work
Hope was born in Morebattle, Roxburghshire, Scotland, the son of Robert Hope, a landowner, and his wife Joan, née Culbertson. In November 1856, Hope was elected to represent South Western Province in the Legislative Council of Victoria. He served until around August 1864, and again from April 1867 until September 1874 when ill health forced him to resign.

References

 

1812 births
1878 deaths
Members of the Victorian Legislative Council
People from Roxburgh
Scottish emigrants to colonial Australia
19th-century Australian politicians